Oppression Olympics is a characterization of marginalization as a competition to determine the relative weight of the overall oppression of individuals or groups, often by comparing race, gender, socioeconomic status or disabilities, in order to determine who is the worst off, and the most oppressed. The characterization often arises within debates about the ideological values of identity politics, intersectionality, and social privilege. The term became used among some feminist scholars in the 1990s. The first potential recorded use of the term as a way to theorize comparing oppression was by Chicana feminist Elizabeth Martínez in a conversation with Angela Davis at the University of California, San Diego in 1993. Martínez stated: "the general idea is no competition of hierarchies should prevail. No 'Oppression Olympics'!"

Dynamics 
The Oppression Olympics have been described as a contest within a group, to "assert who is more authentic, more oppressed, and thus more correct". This may be on the basis of one's race, gender, sexuality, among other stated or ascribed identities.

A person's stated or ascribed identity "become[s] fetishised" within the group and judged in preconceived essentialist terms. There is a dynamic "of agreeing with the most marginalized in the room".

According to Stoyan Francis, "the gold medal of the Oppression Olympics is seen as the commanding spot for demanding change, for visibility and allocation of resources".

Usage 
Elizabeth Martínez, in a conversation with Angela Davis on May 12, 1993, responded to a question about coalition building as follows: "There are various forms of working together. A coalition is one, a network is another, an alliance is yet another. ... But the general idea is no competition of hierarchies should prevail. No Oppression Olympics!" Davis supported Martínez's characterization and stated, "As Betita has pointed out, we need to be more flexible in our thinking about various ways of working together across differences."

Martínez would later write more extensively about the "Oppression Olympics" in her 1998 monograph De Colores Means All of Us: Latina Views for a Multi-Colored Century. In a foreword for the book, Angela Davis writes that Martínez evoked "a term that will be recognized by many who have heard her speak" and states that Martínez "urges us not to engage in 'Oppression Olympics' [or create] a futile hierarchy of suffering, but, rather, to harness our rage at persisting injustices in order to strengthen our opposition to an increasingly complex system of domination, which weaves together racism, patriarchy, homophobia, and global capitalist exploitation".

Criticism 
The dynamics of the Oppression Olympics have been criticized as being "intellectually lazy, lacking political depth", and "leads towards tokenization".
These dynamics surrounding identity politics have been criticized within anarchist thought for their social hierarchy building, with anarchists fundamentally being against notions of hierarchy.

Academic Ange-Marie Hancock has criticized the energy spent upon the Oppression Olympics within progressive circles as being an impediment to wider collective action in furthering social change. She opines that "Thanks to the Oppression Olympics and the political complexity facing the twenty-first century, standing in solidarity for wide social transformation is increasingly difficult to begin and challenging to pursue."

Scholarly work 
In her article "Dialogical Epistemology—An Intersectional Resistance to the 'Oppression Olympics, Nira Yuval-Davis addresses the issue of Oppression Olympics and argues that categorical intersectionality provides an enhancement to this problem.

In her work Solidarity Politics for Millennials: A Guide to Ending the Oppression Olympics, Ange-Marie Hancock argues that the core causes for Oppression Olympics are the desire to one-up other victims, and blindness to the plights and disadvantages of other groups.

Research in identity studies have termed this (inter-group) competitive victimhood.

See also 
 Triple oppression
 Victim mentality
 Identity politics

References 

1993 neologisms
Angela Davis
Identity politics
Intersectionality